The Shire of Winchelsea was a local government area about  southwest of Melbourne, the state capital of Victoria, Australia.

History

Winchelsea was first incorporated as a road district on 9 November 1860, and became a shire on 27 May 1864. On 6 May 1919, part of the shire was annexed to the then new Shire of Otway, and on 31 May 1927, parts were annexed to the Shire of Barrabool. On 1 April 1989, Winchelsea annexed parts of the Shire of Barrabool, and was re subdivided into three ridings.

On 9 March 1994, the Shire of Winchelsea was abolished, and along with parts of the City of South Barwon and the Shire of Barrabool, was merged into the newly created Surf Coast Shire.

Wards

The Shire of Winchelsea was divided into three ridings on 1 April 1989, each of which elected three councillors:
 North Riding
 Middle Riding
 Coast Riding

Towns and localities
 Armytage
 Bambra
 Barwon Downs
 Benwerrin
 Birregurra
 Boonah
 Buckley
 Deans Marsh
 Fairholme
 Lorne
 Murroon
 Ombersley
 Pennyroyal
 Ricketts Marsh
 Ripplevale
 Wensleydale
 Whoorel
 Winchelsea*
 Wurdiboluc
 Yan Yan Gurt

* Council seat.

Population

* Estimate in 1958 Victorian Year Book.

References

External links
 Victorian Places - Winchelsea Shire

Winchelsea